Hartmut Puls (born 25 January 1945) is a German wrestler. He competed in the men's Greco-Roman 57 kg at the 1968 Summer Olympics.

References

External links
 

1945 births
Living people
German male sport wrestlers
Olympic wrestlers of East Germany
Wrestlers at the 1968 Summer Olympics
Sportspeople from Pomeranian Voivodeship
People from Chojnice